Five out of Five (Live in Japan) is a live album by hard rock group Talisman, recorded in Kawasaki, Japan on September 27, 1993. A deluxe edition was also released in 2012, in digipak packaging and remixed.

Track listing
 "Mysterious (This Time It's Serious)"
 "Standin' on Fire"
 "Comin' Home"
 "If U Would Only Be My Friend"
 "I'll Be Waiting"
 "Time After Time"
 "All I Want"
 "Dangerous"
 "U Done Me Wrong"
 "Break Your Chains"
 "Just Between Us"
 "All Or Nothing"

Personnel
Jeff Scott Soto – lead vocals
Marcel Jacob – bass
Fredrik Åkesson – guitar
Jamie Borger – drums

References
 Talisman discography

Talisman (band) albums
1994 live albums